Robert Benayoun (12 December 1926 in Kenitra, Morocco – 20 October 1996, Paris) was a French film critic and author, and one-time member of the jury at the Cannes Film Festival of 1980. He wrote books on Tex Avery, Woody Allen, Buster Keaton, the Marx Brothers, and Alain Resnais.

He wrote screenplays for and directed three films. Benayoun was one of comedian Jerry Lewis's greatest supporters and directed a film about him called Bonjour Mr. Lewis. He also directed the 1975 film Serious as Pleasure.

References

External links 
 

1926 births
1996 deaths
20th-century French non-fiction writers
20th-century French male writers
French film directors
People from Kenitra
Moroccan emigrants to France